Villanueva de la Concepción is a town and municipality in the province of Málaga, part of the autonomous community of Andalucía in southern Spain. The municipality is situated approximately 35 kilometres from the provincial capital of Málaga. It is located at the foot of El Torcal. It has an altitude between 400 and 500 metres.
It is known as the more romantic village at Spain. This is because its Hall has promoted several actions such as including several romantic messages in the streets of this village.

References

Municipalities in the Province of Málaga